Circuit des Ardennes may refer to:

Circuit des Ardennes (cycling), a cycling stage race held in France
Circuit des Ardennes (motor racing), an annual motor race held between 1902 and 1907 in Belgium